Sai Yinjirigala or Saiyinjirigala (born 4 December 1989 in Zhenglan Banner, Inner Mongolia) is a Chinese male judoka of Mongol ethnicity. He represented China at the 2016 Summer Olympics in Rio de Janeiro, Brazil.

References

External links
 
 
 

1989 births
Living people
Chinese male judoka
Olympic judoka of China
Judoka at the 2016 Summer Olympics
People from Xilingol League
Sportspeople from Inner Mongolia
21st-century Chinese people